Erin Tate is the former drummer of Seattle-based indie rock band Minus the Bear and Hand of the Hills, a side project started with David Totten (The Quiet Ones, Scriptures) and Matt Benham (Black Swedes). Before starting Minus the Bear in 2001, he was a member of Kill Sadie. He has also played drums for Askeleton, Amy Blaschke, Heather Duby, Onalaska, These Arms Are Snakes, and Shampoop.

References

Living people
American drummers
Musicians from Seattle
Minus the Bear members
Year of birth missing (living people)